Bill James (born 1929) is a pseudonym of James Tucker, a Welsh novelist. He also writes under his own name and the pseudonyms David Craig and Judith Jones. He was a reporter with the Daily Mirror and various other newspapers after serving with the RAF He is married, with four children, and lives in South Wales.

The bulk of his output under the Bill James pseudonym is the Harpur and Iles series. Colin Harpur is a Detective Chief Inspector and Desmond Iles is the Assistant Chief Constable in an unnamed coastal city in southwestern England. Harpur and Iles are complemented by an evolving cast of other recurring characters on both sides of the law. The books are characterized by a grim humour and a bleak view of the relationship between the public, the police force and the criminal element. The first few are designated "A Detective Colin Harpur Novel" but as the series progressed they began to be published with the designation "A Harpur & Iles Mystery".

His novel Whose Little Girl are You, written under the "David Craig" pseudonym, was filmed as The Squeeze, starring Stacy Keach, Edward Fox and David Hemmings. The fourth Harpur & Iles novel, Protection, was televised by the BBC in 1996 as Harpur & Iles, starring Aneirin Hughes as Harpur and Hywel Bennett as Iles.

Works as Bill James ("Detective Colin Harpur" and "Harpur & Iles" novels) 
 You'd Better Believe It, 1985
 The Lolita Man, 1986
 Halo Parade, 1987
 Protection 1988, also published as Harpur & Iles 1992
 Come Clean, 1989
 Take, 1990
 Club, 1991
 Astride a Grave, 1991
 Gospel, 1992
 Roses, Roses, 1993
 In Good Hands, 1994
 The Detective is Dead, 1995
 Top Banana, 1996
 Panicking Ralph, 1997
 Lovely Mover, 1998
 Eton Crop, 1999
 Kill Me, 2000
 Pay Days, 2001
 Naked at the Window, 2002
 The Girl with the Long Back, 2003
 Easy Streets, 2004
 Wolves of Memory, 2005
 Girls, 2006
 Pix, 2007
 In the Absence of Iles, 2008
 Hotbed, 2009
 I Am Gold, 2010
 Vacuum, 2011
 Undercover, 2012
 Play Dead, 2013
 Disclosures, 2014
 Blaze Away, 2015
 First Fix Your Alibi, 2016
 Close, 2017
 Hitmen I Have Known, 2019

Works as Bill James ("Simon Abelard" novels) 
 Split, 2001 
 A Man's Enemies, 2003

Works as Bill James (other) 
 The Last Enemy, 1997
 Double jeopardy (a Kerry Lake novel - see Judith Jones, below), 2002
 Middleman, 2002 
 Between Lives, 2003
 Making Stuff Up, 2006
 The Sixth Man and other Stories (short stories, includes Harpur and Iles stories), 2006
 Letters from Carthage, 2007
 Off-street Parking,  2008
 Full of Money 2009
 World War Two Will Not Take Place 2011

Works as David Craig ("Roy Rickman" novels) 
 The Alias Man, 1968 (1968)
 Message Ends, 1969 (1969)
 Contact Lost, 1970 (1970)

Works as David Craig ("Bellecroix and Roath" novels) 
 Young Men May Die, 1970 (1970)
 A Walk at Night, 1971 (1971)

Works as David Craig ("Brade and Jenkins" novels) 
 Forget it, (1995)
 The Tattoed Detective, (1998)
 Torch, (1999)
 Bay City, (2000)

Works as David Craig ("Sally Bithron" novels) 
 Hear me Talking to You, (2005)
 Tip Top, (2006)

Works as David Craig (other) 
 Up from the Grave, 1971 (1971)
 Double Take, 1972 (1972)
 Bolthole (US title: Knifeman), 1973 (1973)
 A Dead Liberty, 1974 (1974)
 Whose Little Girl are You? (US title: The Squeeze), 1974 (1974)
 The Albion Case, 1975 (1975)
 Faith, Hope and Death, 1976 (1976)

Works as Judith Jones ("Kerry Lake" novels) 
 Baby Talk, (1998)
 After Melissa, (1999)

Works as James Tucker (fiction) 
 Equal Partners, (1960)
 The Right Hand Man, (1961)
 Burster, (1966)
 Blaze of Riot, 1979 (1979)
 The King's Friends, (1982)

Works as James Tucker (non-fiction) 
 Honourable Estates, (1966)
 The Novels of Anthony Powell, 1976 (1976)

Dates given without parentheses are the Library of Congress publication dates, usually the first US publication, except where the books do not (yet) appear in the Library of Congress Online Catalog. The dates in parentheses are the copyright dates, taken from the actual books when available.

References 
 Library of Congress Online Catalog (birth and publication dates)
 Liner notes for Protection (biographical information)
 John Lennard, 'Of Policemen and Poussin: Bill James's Dance to the Muzak of Crime', in Of Sex and Faerie: Further essays on Genre Fiction (Tirril: Humanities-Ebooks, 2010), pp. 10–46

Welsh crime novelists
1929 births
Living people
British male novelists
20th-century Welsh novelists
21st-century Welsh novelists
British male journalists
Daily Mirror people
Royal Air Force personnel
20th-century British male writers
21st-century British male writers